Salem Chapel is a former United Reformed Church in Dundee, Scotland. Now a Category C listed building, it was built in 1872, to a design by newly appointed Dundee City Architect William Alexander.

The church, which was established in the city in 1839, held its first service in the building on 6 October 1872. It closed in 2019, after 147 years, holding its final service on 24 November.

See also

List of listed buildings in Dundee

References

External links
United Reformed Church
Salem Chapel – Scottish Churches

Churches in Dundee
1872 establishments in Scotland
2019 establishments in Scotland
Churches completed in 1872
United Reformed churches in Scotland
19th-century Roman Catholic church buildings
Listed buildings in Dundee
Listed churches in Scotland